HMS H32 was a H-class submarine constructed for the Royal Navy. The submarine entered service in 1919 and served in the Second World War, one of only seven of the class to do so. During Warship Week 1942 H32 was adopted by Lydney RDC (Gloucestershire). The submarine was sold for scrap in 1944.

Design

H32 was fitted with an anti-aircraft gun and four  torpedo tubes. Its torpedo tubes were fitted to the bows and the submarine was loaded with eight 21-inch torpedoes. The design is based on the Holland 602 type submarine but altered to meet Royal Navy specifications. The submarine had a complement of twenty-two crew members.

Construction and career
H32 was built by Vickers Limited, Barrow-in-Furness. She was laid down on 20 April 1917 and was launched on 19 November 1918. The boat was commissioned on 14 May 1919.

Upon commissioning, HMS H32 was assigned to be a tender to the submarine depot ship . The submarine was also the first Royal Navy boat to be fitted with the ASDIC (Anti Submarine Detector Investigation Committee) underwater sensor system. At the onset of the Second World War, H32 was a member of the 6th Submarine Flotilla. From 26–29 August 1939, the flotilla deployed to its war bases at Dundee and Blyth. H32 was among the submarines assigned to the patrol.

HMS H32 was sold for scrap at Troon on 18 October 1944.

See also
 List of submarines of the Second World War

References

Bibliography
 
 
 
 

 

British H-class submarines
Ships built in Barrow-in-Furness
1918 ships
World War I submarines of the United Kingdom
World War II submarines of the United Kingdom
Royal Navy ship names